Max Lord may refer to:

 Maxwell Lord, a supervillain appearing in comic books published by DC Comics
 Max Lord (baseball) (1925–2019), Australian baseball player